KRSS (93.5 FM) is a Christian radio station licensed to Tarkio, Missouri, United States. The station is owned by Radio Free Ministries, Inc.

References

External links

RSS